Choghamish District is a district (bakhsh) in Dezful County, Khuzestan Province, Iran. At the 2006 census, its population was 28,361, in 5,494 families.  The district has one city Choghamish. The district has two rural districts (dehestan): Choghamish Rural District and Kheybar Rural District.

References 

Dezful County
Districts of Khuzestan Province